Highway 175 (Carretera Federal 175) is a Federal Highway of Mexico. The highway travels from Buenavista, Veracruz in the north to Puerto Ángel, Oaxaca in the south. The highway crosses Mexican Federal Highway 200 before reaching the Pacific Ocean at Puerto Ángel at its southern terminus.

References

175